Stuart Hamilton (1929–2017) was a Canadian pianist, operatic vocal coach, radio broadcaster, artistic director, and producer.

Stuart Hamilton may also refer to:

Stuart Hamilton (public servant) (born 1950), Australian senior public servant
Stuart Hamilton (footballer) (1918–1990), Australian rules footballer